("the little death") is an expression that means "the brief loss or weakening of consciousness" and in modern usage refers specifically to "the sensation of post orgasm as likened to death."

The first attested use of the expression in English was in 1572 with the meaning of "fainting fit." It later came to mean "nervous spasm" as well. The first attested use with the meaning of "orgasm" was in 1882. In modern usage, this term has generally been interpreted to describe the post-orgasmic state of unconsciousness that some people have after having some sexual experiences.

More widely, it can refer to the spiritual release that comes with orgasm or to a short period of melancholy or transcendence as a result of the expenditure of the "life force".

The term  does not always apply to sexual experiences. It can also be used when some undesired thing has happened to a person and has affected them so much that "a part of them dies inside." A literary example of this is found in Thomas Hardy's Tess of the D'Urbervilles when he uses the phrase to describe how Tess feels after she comes across a particularly gruesome omen after meeting with her own rapist:

She felt the petite mort at this unexpectedly gruesome information, and left the solitary man behind her.

Specifically, it is defined as "a state or event resembling or prefiguring death; a weakening or loss of consciousness, specifically in sleep or during an orgasm," a nearly identical definition to that of the original French.

See also 
 Georges Bataille
 Sexual headache
 Dhat syndrome
 Post-coital tristesse
 Postorgasmic illness syndrome
Refractory period

References

Further reading 

French words and phrases
Orgasm
Sexuality
Sexual slang
fr:La petite mort